Valerius Geist (2 February 1938 – 6 July 2021) was a Canadian biologist and a professor emeritus in the Faculty of Environmental Design at the University of Calgary. He was a specialist on the biology, behavior, and social dynamics of North American large mammals (elk, moose, bighorn sheep, other wild ungulates and wolves), and well respected on his views of Neanderthal people and behavior.

Biography
He was born on February 2, 1938, in Mykolaiv, Ukraine, USSR and raised in Austria and Germany. In 1961 he married the biologist Renate Geist, née Brall (1937 - 2014).

He earned a B.Sc. in zoology (1960), and Ph.D. in zoology (1967), both from the University of British Columbia. He completed his postdoctoral studies in Seewiesen, Germany at the Max Planck Institute for Behavioral Physiology (1967-1968) under Konrad Lorenz. His doctoral thesis was entitled On the behaviour and evolution of American mountain sheep.

Since 1977, he has taught at the University of Calgary, where he was a founding member and first Program Director of Environmental Science in the Faculty of Environmental Design. He resided on Vancouver Island, B.C.

Scientific and public work 
Valerius Geist is known for his scientific research on the behavior and population biology of many wild ungulate species and canids. After a period of supporting the keeping of game in ranches as a way to use the animals while protecting them, he warned that the Alberta government's recommendation to keep deer in enclosures was a mistake both scientifically and economically. When calamities caused by disease and the collapse of the market forced many ranchers to slaughter their animals and close their farms, this was confirmed.

Geist became an outspoken commentator on wolves and recognized them as dangerous predators to humans. He was of the opinion that wolves are most likely to fulfill their ecological function in unpopulated and very thinly populated areas. His publications on wolves include as topics also the development of great shyness towards humans by hunting (a shyness now dangerously rare as environmentalists work tirelessly to protect these dangerous animals), hybridization with coyotes, where distribution areas of both species overlap, hybridization with domestic dogs in areas populated by humans, and diseases spread by wolves, for example the dog tapeworm, whose larval stages lead to Hydatid disease in herbivores and humans. By triggering panicky flight behavior in deer packs and causing them to migrate, wolves promote the spread of Chronic Wasting Disease.

In his lectures and writings he points out that wolves cause serious damage to wildlife and that they cause great suffering to wild ungulates such as white-tailed deer, elk, and bison by condemning them to a slow, agonising death when they are torn.

The paradigm of the self-regulation of nature is, according to his findings, a simple-minded intellectual error. The mechanisms of negative feedback assumed in this concept would not work like this in nature, but selfreinforcing effects would lead to a decline in biodiversity. With active wildlife management and care, humans can achieve a much greater biodiversity and productivity of ecosystems. Humans can save the game the brutality of getting torn by wolves. Hunters practicing ethical hunting would treat game far more humanely than "nature" does.

Regarding the behavior of wolves towards human beings he described seven steps from strong shyness and avoiding the nearness of the human, then searching anthropogenic food sources and habituation, then possible explorative attacks, in which they only approach, up to predatory attacks on people, that usually take place only under the precondition that the seven steps described by him are passed through.  He became involved in the inquiry surrounding the death of Kenton Carnegie November 8, 2005 at Wollaston Lake, Points North Landing, Saskatchewan, Canada. Geist expressed growing concern as wolves began to follow his wife outside their home on Vancouver Island and threaten her safety.  When wolves appear friendly, they are simply examining the menu.  He was openly critical of the myth that wolves do not attack people and observed that Joseph Stalin promulgated this Big Lie in his effort to disarm the rural population which had traditionally kept firearms for protection.

Geist also worked in the field of palaeozoology of ungulates and canids and researched the differences in the ecological status of wolves in the pleistocene Megafauna and the present wild fauna. In relation to the respective works, he pointed out the presence of 'Predator pits' that were caused by gray wolf (Canis lupus) predation on Holarctic ungulates, resulting in the lowering of ungulate distributions and populations to suboptimal levels, and kept suboptimal via brown/grizzly bear (Ursus arctos) attrition on ungulate calves during birthing seasons. Further, the explanation offered by Geist to how the Pleistocene ecology of the Gray Wolf did not have the same impacts, were that megafaunal hypercarnivores such as the taxa Machairodontinae, Panthera, and Arctodus simus suppressed them as a direct consequence of intense competition amongst the megafauna predator guild, at the time.

He has acted as an expert witness in many areas, including animal behavior, environmental policy, native treaties, wildlife law enforcement and policy, and wildlife/vehicle collisions cases in the United States and Canada. He has testified on wildlife conservation policy in court, before Senate of the State of Montana and before the Parliamentary Committee on Environment, and Sustainable Development in Ottawa.

Geist's interest in Neanderthal people was captured in a National Geographic article suggesting that Neanderthal may not have learned to throw, supported by their hunting methods.  He noted the likely possibility that they engaged in cannibalism, and that they may have actually ranched children from other tribes for food.  He suggested that ancient cave art was more likely to be graffiti, left by young men who dared one another to go deep into the earth to make their marks.  In this, he strongly supported R. Dale Guthrie's published views The Nature of Paleolithic Art by Guthrie R. Dale (2006-02-01).

Awards
Geist won the Wilderness Defenders Award from the Alberta Wilderness Association in 2004. He is the only North American hunter to be honored with professional membership in both the Boone and Crockett Club and its European counterpart, the International Council for Game and Wildlife Conservation (Conseil International de la Chasse).

Selected publications
 "Gray wolves and the black side of the 'Nature knows best' dogma, or how hands-on management is vital to high biodiversity, productivity and a humane treatment of wildlife". In: Beiträge zur Jagd- & Wildforschung, Band 44, 2019, page 65-71
Living on the Edge: The Mountain Goat's World, by Valerius Geist, Dale E. Toweill, October 19, 2010
Valerius Geist (2009): Wolves – When Ignorance Is Bliss 
Valerius Geist (2007): Circumstances leading to wolf attacks on people
Valerius Geist; Will N. Graves: Wolves in Russia - Anxiety Through the Ages. Detselig Enterprises 2007. 
Valerius Geist: Wolves on Vancouver Island
Moose: Behavior, Ecology, Conservation, by Valerius Geist, Robert Wegner (Foreword By), Michael H. Francis (Photographer), November 26, 2005
Whitetail Tracks: The Deer's History & Impact in North America, by Valerius Geist, Michael H. Francis (Photographer) September 2001
Antelope Country: Pronghorns: The Last Americans, by Valerius Geist, Michael H. Francis (Photographer) 2001
Return of Royalty: Wild Sheep of North America, by Valerius Geist, Dale E. Toweill, Ken Carlson (Illustrator) 1999
Mule Deer Country, by Valerius Geist, Michael H. Francis, October 31, 1990
Deer of the World: Their Evolution, Behaviour, and Ecology, by Valerius Geist, Swan Hill Press (February 16, 1999)
Buffalo Nation: History and Legend of the North American Bison, by Valerius Geist, May 9, 1998 (also 1996)
Wildlife Conservation Policy, by Valerius Geist and Ian McTaggart-Cowan October 15, 1995
Wild Sheep Country, by Valerius Geist, Michael H. Francis (Photographer), September 1993
Elk Country, by Valerius Geist, June 1993 (also 1991)
Life Strategies, Human Evolution, Environmental Design: Toward a Biological Theory of Health, by Valerius Geist, January 26, 1979
Mountain Sheep: A Study in Behavior and Evolution. Wildlife Behavior and Ecology Series, by Valerius Geist, 1971

References

Canadian Who's Who 1993
Nature Canada, Spring, 1987

1938 births
2021 deaths
Academic staff of the University of Calgary
Canadian biologists
Canadian science writers
Ukrainian emigrants to Canada